Vladislav Zhikov (Bulgarian: Владислав Жиков; born 19 January 1999) is a Bulgarian professional footballer who plays as a midfielder for Italian lower-league side ASD Volterrana 2016.

Career

Youth career
Zhikov was born in Vidin, but at age of 5 he moved with his family in Castellammare di Stabia, Italy. He started his career in Club Napoli together with Gianluigi Donnarumma. In 2013 he and Dunnarumma were spotted by Milan scouts and were both transferred in the Rossoneri's academy. In 2016 he was listed by The Guardian in the Next Generation 2016 of the best young talents in world football. Same year Vincenzo Montella took him to train with the first team of Milan. In October he was watched by Chelsea.

Livorno
On 10 August 2017, Livorno announced that Zhikov is now player of Labronici. Zhikov himself said that he preferred to move to Livorno in order to get more first team chances over playing for Primavera teams. He completed his professional debut for the team in the last league match for the season on 8 May 2018 against Piacenza.

Olhanense
On 16 January 2019, Portuguese club Olhanense announced the signing of Zhikov.

Volterrana
Zhikov joined Italian lower-league side ASD Volterrana 2016 in August 2020.

Career statistics

Club

Honours
Individual
 The Guardian Top 60 Next Generation: 2016

References

External links
 

1999 births
Living people
Bulgarian footballers
Bulgarian expatriate footballers
Bulgaria youth international footballers
Association football midfielders
Serie C players
U.S. Livorno 1915 players
S.C. Olhanense players
Expatriate footballers in Italy
Expatriate footballers in Portugal
Bulgarian expatriate sportspeople in Italy
Bulgarian expatriate sportspeople in Portugal
People from Vidin